The 2015 Estoril Open (also known as the Millennium Estoril Open for sponsorship purposes) was a tennis tournament played on outdoor clay courts. The 2015 tournament was the first edition of the Estoril Open (which replaced the Portugal Open), and part of the ATP World Tour 250 series of the 2015 ATP World Tour. The event took place at the Clube de Ténis do Estoril in Cascais, Portugal, from April 25 through May 3, 2015.

Singles main draw entrants

Seeds

 Rankings are as of April 20, 2015.

Other entrants
The following players received wildcards into the singles main draw:
  Gastão Elias
  Rui Machado
  Frederico Ferreira Silva

The following players received entry from the qualifying draw:
  Kenny de Schepper
  Constant Lestienne
  Martin Fischer
  Roberto Carballés Baena

The following player received entry as a lucky loser:
  David Vega Hernández

Withdrawals
Before the tournament
  Marcos Baghdatis →replaced by Stéphane Robert
  Carlos Berlocq →replaced by Robin Haase
  Adrian Mannarino →replaced by Alejandro González
  Tommy Robredo →replaced by David Vega Hernández

Doubles main draw entrants

Seeds

 Rankings are as of April 20, 2015.

Other entrants
The following pairs received wildcards into the doubles main draw:
  João Domingues /  Pedro Sousa
  Rui Machado /  Frederico Ferreira Silva

Champions

Singles

  Richard Gasquet def.  Nick Kyrgios, 6–3, 6–2

Doubles

  Treat Huey /  Scott Lipsky def.  Marc López /  David Marrero, 6–1, 6–4

References

External links
 Official website

 
Estoril Open
Estoril Open
Estoril Open (tennis)